Tatyana Mashkova (born March 6, 1988) is a Kazakhstani beach volleyball player. She competed at the 2012 Asian Beach Games in Haiyang, China.

References

External links
 
 

1988 births
Living people
Kazakhstani beach volleyball players
Beach volleyball players at the 2010 Asian Games
Beach volleyball players at the 2014 Asian Games
Beach volleyball players at the 2018 Asian Games
Asian Games competitors for Kazakhstan
21st-century Kazakhstani women